Dean College is a private college in Franklin, Massachusetts. It offers bachelor's degrees, associate degrees, and continuing and professional education and certificates.

History 
Dean College was founded by Dr. Oliver Dean as a co-educational academy, Dean Academy, in 1865. Dr. Dean was an enthusiastic benefactor of the academy and donated approximately nine acres of land for the site of the school and donated $125,000 towards its construction. After the groundbreaking ceremony held earlier in the year, the first class at Dean Academy began on October 1, 1866, with 44 students attending. The students held class at the local Universalist Church.

Dean Hall, the main building of Dean Academy, was not finished until 1868. During the summer of 1872, Dean Hall was completely destroyed by fire, but reconstruction efforts began immediately. On June 7, 1874, the newly rebuilt Dean Hall was rededicated.

The school's name would change two more times, becoming Dean Junior College in May 1941 and then evolving into Dean College in May 1994.

The school's mascot is a bulldog named Boomer.

Notable alumni include Richard Belzer (John Munch on Law & Order: Special Victims Unit) who was kicked out of Dean College when it was known as Dean Junior College. The founders of CVS Pharmacy, Sid Goldstein and Stanley Goldstein, and the founder of the Fletcher School of Law and Diplomacy, Austin Barclay Fletcher, also attended Dean. Major League Baseball players Eddie Grant and Gabby Hartnett, sportscaster Greg Dickerson, professional football player Zachary Dixon, best-selling author Emilie Baker Loring, and Academy Award-winning actor Broderick Crawford are also notable alumni.

Campus 
The  campus includes Dean Hall, the college's oldest structure which houses classrooms, radio station Power 88 WGAO, offices, athletics offices, basketball/volleyball gymnasium, the Center for Student Administrative Services (CSAS), Campus Safety, video production studios/classrooms, the president's office and board room, and two floors of student residences.

In 2011, Dean College unveiled a new campus center.

Dean has completed over $60 million in campus improvements over the past 10 years, including Dorothy and Glendon Horne '31 Hall, Green Family Library Learning Commons, Morton Family Learning Center, athletic field updates (press box, scoreboards, dugouts), Grant Field renovation, and the Rooney Shaw Center for Innovation in Teaching.

There are 13 different residence halls on campus, including furnished condominiums in downtown Franklin, suite-style living, all-female residence halls, all-male residence halls and co-ed residence halls.

Dean College offers bachelor's degree and associate degree programs within four schools: School of the Arts, Dean R. Sanders '47 School of Business, Joan Phelps Palladino School of Dance, and School of Liberal Arts. Dean also offers part-time continuing studies options to serve students who wish to pursue their education on a part-time basis. Part-time students may also enroll in certificate programs.

Athletics 
Dean College offers 16 athletic teams. The teams are known as the Bulldogs. The Bulldogs participate in Division III of the NCAA in the following sports:

Upon transition into the NCAA they accepted membership for all sports into the Great Northeast Athletic Conference except for football which accepted membership into the Eastern Collegiate Football Conference.

Dean College also offers intramural sports.

Notable alumni
 Richard Belzer, actor, stand-up comedian, and author
 Broderick Crawford, Academy Award-winning actor
 Jack Cronin, professional football player
 Greg Dickerson, sportscaster
 Zachary Dixon, professional football player
 Sage Francis, hip hop recording artist and spoken word poet
 Austin Barclay Fletcher, founder of the Fletcher School of Law and Diplomacy
 Eddie Grant, lawyer, professional baseball player, U.S. soldier during World War I, and namesake of Grant Field at Dean College
 Sid Goldstein and Stanley Goldstein, founders of CVS Pharmacy 
 William D. Green, business executive
 Walt Handelsman, editorial cartoonist
 Gabby Hartnett, professional baseball player
 Doc Hazelton, professional baseball player and college coach
 Eric Holtz, basketball coach
 James Gordon Irving, natural-history illustrator
 Emilie Baker Loring, romance novelist
 Kodo Nishimura, Japanese Buddhist monk, and makeup artist
 Baran Süzer, Turkish businessman
 Thomas Paolino, politician
 Lucky Whitehead, professional football player
 Francis H. Woodward, politician
 Maury Youmans, professional football player

See also

National Register of Historic Places listings in Norfolk County, Massachusetts

References

External links
 Official website
 Official Athletics website

 
Educational institutions established in 1865
Historic districts in Norfolk County, Massachusetts
Two-year colleges in the United States
Private universities and colleges in Massachusetts
Universities and colleges in Norfolk County, Massachusetts
National Register of Historic Places in Norfolk County, Massachusetts
Historic districts on the National Register of Historic Places in Massachusetts
NJCAA athletics
1865 establishments in Massachusetts